Santo Domingo Tlatayápam is a village and small municipality in Oaxaca in south-western Mexico. The municipality covers an area of 12 km². 
It is part of the Teposcolula District in the center of the Mixteca Region

As of the 2010 census, the village had a population of 147 inhabitants, while the municipality had a total population of 153 inhabitants. It is the third-smallest municipality in Mexico in population (following Santa Magdalena Jicotlán and Santiago Tepetlapa, both also in Oaxaca).

References

Municipalities of Oaxaca